Mun tahu (燜豆腐 / 焖豆腐) is Chinese Indonesian dish of soft tofu braised in savoury thick white sauce, mixed with minced chicken and shrimp.

Etymology
The mun (燜/焖, literally means "braised") cooking technique suggests that it is of Hakka origin. While tahu is tofu in Indonesian.

Ingredients
Its main ingredient is soft and smooth silken tofu, or its variant the yellowish egg tofu, braised with meat and sprinkled with chopped leeks. It is mildly flavoured with garlic, ginger and onion, seasoned with small amount of soy sauce, salt and pepper. The colour of the sauce is whitish due to minimal addition of soy sauce. This white sauce is thickened using batter of tapioca powder or maize powder; resulting in a thick, slightly runny, gelatinized white sauce. Mun tahu usually also contains minced chicken or seafood, most commonly peeled shrimp, or sometimes minced beef or pork.

It has mildly savoury flavour with pleasantly soft texture, suitable for young children or adults in convalescence.

See also

 Sapo tahu
 List of tofu dishes
 Cap cai
 Tahu goreng
 Chinese Indonesian cuisine

References

Indonesian Chinese cuisine
Tofu dishes